White County is a county located in the northeastern part of the U.S. state of Georgia. As of the 2020 census, the population was 28,003. The county seat is Cleveland. The county was created on December 22, 1857, formerly a part of Habersham County and most likely was named for Newton County Representative David T. White, who helped a Habersham representative successfully attain passage of an act creating the new county.

Geography

The county is mostly located in the foothills of the Blue Ridge Mountains. Northern parts of the county have the highest elevations, being in the mountains themselves. The highest point in White County is  Tray Mountain, shared with Towns County to the north.  Tray Mountain is the 6th-highest mountain in Georgia.  Another very prominent White County peak is Yonah Mountain, also known as Mount Yonah.  This  peak, located between Helen and Cleveland, is rimmed by sheer cliffs and is the highest point on Georgia's Piedmont Plateau.

All of White County is located in the Upper Chattahoochee River sub-basin of the ACF River Basin (Apalachicola-Chattahoochee-Flint River Basin).

Adjacent counties
 Towns County - north
 Habersham County - east
 Hall County - south
 Lumpkin County - west
 Union County - northwest

Protected areas
 Chattahoochee National Forest (part)
 Unicoi State Park

Transportation

Major highways

  U.S. Route 129
  State Route 11
  State Route 17
  State Route 75
  State Route 75 Alternate
  State Route 115
  State Route 254
  State Route 255
  State Route 284
  State Route 348
  State Route 356
  State Route 384

Pedestrians and cycling

 River Bridge Trail
 River Hiking Trail
 Unicoi State Park Trail

 Yonah Preserve Trail

Demographics

2000 census
As of the census of 2000, there were 19,944 people, 7,731 households, and 5,782 families living in the county.  The population density was 83 people per square mile (32/km2).  There were 9,454 housing units at an average density of 39 per square mile (15/km2).  The racial makeup of the county was 95.16% White, 2.17% Black or African American, 0.40% Native American, 0.51% Asian, 0.18% Pacific Islander, 0.51% from other races, and 1.07% from two or more races.  1.56% of the population were Hispanic or Latino of any race.

There were 7,731 households, out of which 31.20% had children under the age of 18 living with them, 62.70% were married couples living together, 8.70% had a female householder with no husband present, and 25.20% were non-families. 21.70% of all households were made up of individuals, and 8.60% had someone living alone who was 65 years of age or older.  The average household size was 2.51 and the average family size was 2.91.

In the county, the population was spread out, with 23.20% under the age of 18, 9.20% from 18 to 24, 27.80% from 25 to 44, 25.20% from 45 to 64, and 14.60% who were 65 years of age or older.  The median age was 38 years. For every 100 females there were 98.20 males.  For every 100 females age 18 and over, there were 94.80 males.

The median income for a household in the county was $36,084, and the median income for a family was $40,704. Males had a median income of $29,907 versus $22,168 for females. The per capita income for the county was $17,193.  About 8.40% of families and 10.50% of the population were below the poverty line, including 12.30% of those under age 18 and 15.40% of those age 65 or over.

2010 census
As of the 2010 United States Census, there were 27,144 people, 10,646 households, and 7,750 families living in the county. The racial makeup of the county was 95.1% white, 1.7% black or African American, 0.5% Asian, 0.5% American Indian, 0.8% from other races, and 1.4% from two or more races. Those of Hispanic or Latino origin made up 2.4% of the population. In terms of ancestry, 16.0% were English, 14.9% were American, 14.5% were Irish, and 10.8% were German.

Of the 10,646 households, 31.4% had children under the age of 18 living with them, 57.6% were married couples living together, 10.7% had a female householder with no husband present, 27.2% were non-families, and 22.8% of all households were made up of individuals. The average household size was 2.52 and the average family size was 2.93. The median age was 42.3 years.

The median income for a household in the county was $41,756 and the median income for a family was $50,981. Males had a median income of $40,265 versus $31,061 for females. The per capita income for the county was $23,680. About 16.9% of families and 19.4% of the population were below the poverty line, including 24.4% of those under age 18 and 12.0% of those age 65 or over.

2020 census

As of the 2020 United States census, there were 28,003 people, 11,695 households, and 8,581 families residing in the county. However, the county is challenging the accuracy of the count.

Communities

Cities
 Cleveland
 Helen

Census-designated places
 Sautee-Nacoochee
 Yonah

Unincorporated communities
 Mossy Creek
 Robertstown
 Scorpion Hollow
 Benefit
 Leaf

Politics

See also
 
 National Register of Historic Places listings in White County, Georgia
 Lanier Meaders
List of counties in Georgia

References

External links
 White County Chamber of Commerce website
 White County Government Website
 White County Historical Society Website
 History of White County, Georgia

 
1857 establishments in Georgia (U.S. state)
Northeast Georgia
Counties of Appalachia
Populated places established in 1857